The Rise and Fall of the Confederate Government (1881) is a book written by Jefferson Davis, who served as President of the Confederate States of America during the American Civil War. Davis wrote the book as a straightforward history of the Confederate States of America and as an apologia for the causes that he believed led to and justified the American Civil War.

He wrote most of the book at Beauvoir, the Biloxi, Mississippi, plantation where he was living as a guest of the novelist and wealthy widow Sarah Ellis Dorsey.  Ill with cancer, in 1878 she made over her will and left the plantation to him before her death in 1879.  She had already assisted him in his writing, notably with organization, editing, and encouragement.

Davis was also assisted by his wife, Varina, and his secretary Major W. T. Walthall.  He corresponded voluminously with surviving Confederate statesmen and generals, including Judah Benjamin and Jubal Early, for fact-checking and details on key issues.

Publication

The book was released in 1881 by the New York publisher D. Appleton & Co. in a two-volume edition totaling more than 1,500 pages and with many engraved illustrations.

Content
What was compelling in the view of Davis's contemporaries and modern scholars was Davis's thoughtfully constructed arguments about the constitutional and moral justification of the formation of the Confederacy and of the Civil War. Davis made many comparisons between the formation of the Continental Congress and the American Revolution and the formation of the Confederate States and the American Civil War. He saw them as being little different ethically or politically, save that the former resulted in victory for the rebels and the latter in defeat. Davis discussed the history of slavery and defended its fundamental morality: in his view, slavery enlightened blacks with the "arts of peace, order and civilization" and slaves were happy and "contented" in their servitude. Davis detailed his belief in the hypocrisy of Northern states with regard to slavery considering that most Northern states had once allowed slavery and that all derived income from trade goods produced by slaves, and the unfairness that he saw in the numerous acts and policies that benefited Northern industrialists to the detriment of Southern planters. Davis cited numerous constitutional passages, constitutional scholars, and American political leaders to support his thesis that secession was justified, including a speech by Abraham Lincoln that argued for the illegality of the American war with Mexico and condemned United States military interference with the rights of Mexicans to self-govern. Davis argued that when a majority of states govern the Union, it is "not as means to secure the welfare of all, but as instruments for the destruction of a part—the minority section."

Reception
Critical response to the book was and continues to be very mixed. The most lavish praise upon the book's release came from Southern reviewers. A more unexpected enthusiast was Oscar Wilde, who pronounced it a masterpiece while admitting that he hadn't read it all. Most historians and literary critics agree that the book could have benefited from editing, as Davis spared little detail in describing every aspect of the Confederate Constitution and government, often in more detail than most readers cared for. He also retold in detail numerous military campaigns for which there were already many and superior sources (many written by generals and other veterans of the campaigns). Davis defended the detailed military accounts in the book by explaining that, unlike most nations, the entire history of the Confederate States of America was inseparable from the story of a war.

By the time of the book's publication, the once-wealthy Davis was elderly, in ill health, and nearly penniless due to the destruction of his estates, the abolition of slavery, and the collapse of the Southern economy during and after the Civil War. He hoped the books would help him in rebuilding his fortune and providing for his family, but while exact figures are disputed, the book was a financial disappointment during his own lifetime for several reasons. It was expensive and thus beyond the reach of many Americans. Davis refused to go on publicity tours that might have aided sales, citing his poor health, his unwillingness to see Southerners pay money they could not afford, and his lack of interest in the book's reception by non-Southerners. Also, sixteen years after the end of the Civil War, interest had begun to wane in the subject, as a new generation of Americans who had not fought in the war became larger, and those who had fought were faced with contemporary problems that were more pressing than the past.

The book was far from a complete failure, selling more than 22,000 copies by 1890, but it was never on par with such 1880s bestsellers as the memoirs of Ulysses S. Grant or Mark Twain's novel The Adventures of Huckleberry Finn. In addition there was much contention between author and publisher: Davis had no prior experience in literary matters and had not signed a particularly generous contract. Davis claimed that Appleton was withholding his full royalties. D. Appleton & Co. stated that the advances disbursed to Davis during the book's writing had consumed most of his royalties for the first few years. Both sides seemed to suspect Major Walthall (who was out of Davis's employ by the time the book was released) of financial improprieties with the advances. Davis filed suit against the publisher in the final year of his life in a case later settled out of court by his heirs shortly after his death. The book remained in print, and subsequent cheaper printings assisted its sales in the decades following Davis's death. This provided some income for his widow in her final years, though her employment as an editorial writer and a modest income from rental of remaining family properties provided most of what financial comfort she enjoyed.

See also
 Lost Cause of the Confederacy
 A Short History of the Confederate States of America by Jefferson Davis

References

External links

 

1881 non-fiction books
American Civil War memoirs
D. Appleton & Company books
History of the Confederate States of America
Jefferson Davis
Lost Cause of the Confederacy